Turkish Electricity Transmission Corporation (Turkish: Türkiye Elektrik İletim A. Ş., abbreviated TEİAŞ) is the transmission system operator for electricity in Turkey. It is a government-owned corporation. It is planned for a minority stake to be sold to the private sector before the end of 2022.

History
In 2006, investigations were begun by ENTSO-E, the European Network of Transmission System Operators, into the technical conditions for the interconnection of the national grid of Turkey to the continental European power system. A trial period of interconnection commenced on 18 September 2010, and after the signing of long term agreements, the interconnection with Europe became a permanent arrangement.

There was a nationwide blackout in 2015.

Operations
According to a study by Sabancı University 20% of Turkey's electricity could be generated from wind and solar by 2026 with no extra transmission costs, and 30% with a minor increase in grid investment.

Subsidies
TEİAŞ distributes extra payments to some power stations in Turkey: some hydro is supported, but this "capacity mechanism" has been criticised as wasting money on too much capacity by supporting some  coal fired power stations in Turkey.

See also

Electricity sector in Turkey
Energy in Turkey

References

External links

Electric power transmission system operators in Turkey